An ultraviolet detector (also known as UV detector or UV-Vis detector) is a type of non-destructive chromatography detector which measures the amount of ultraviolet or visible light absorbed by components of the mixture being eluted off the chromatography column. They are often used as detectors for high-performance liquid chromatography.

References 

Chromatography